Bishop Ellis may refer to:

People
 Charles H. Ellis III, Bishop of the Pentecostal Assemblies of the World
 Edward Ellis, Bishop of Nottingham
 J. Delano Ellis, Chairman of the Joint College of African-American Pentecostal Bishops
 Philip Michael Ellis, Bishop of Segni
 Rowland Ellis, Bishop of Aberdeen and Orkney
 Tim Ellis, Bishop of Grantham
 Welbore Ellis, Bishop of Kildare

Other
 Bishop Ellis Catholic Primary School in Leicestershire